Lamahi may refer to:

 Lamhi, a village in Uttar Pradesh, India
 Lamahi Municipality, a municipality in southwestern Nepal